Cameron Hall (6 January 1897 – 19 December 1983) was an English actor.
  He was born in Hull, East Riding of Yorkshire, and died, aged 86, in Sidmouth, Devon

Selected filmography

 D'Ye Ken John Peel? (1935)
 First a Girl (1935) - Cast Member (uncredited)
 Dark World (1935)
 The Man Behind the Mask (1936) - Cast Member (uncredited)
 This'll Make You Whistle (1936) - Furnishings Salesman (uncredited)
 Conquest of the Air (1936) - Minor Role (uncredited)
 The Lilac Domino (1937) - Arnim
 Adventure's End (1937) - Slivers
 The Citadel (1938) - Man Who Buys Microscope (uncredited)
 Yes, Madam? (1939) - Catlett
 The Stars Look Down (1940) - Cinema Commissionaire (uncredited)
 Contraband (1940) - Naval Officer (uncredited)
 A Window in London (1940) - Hotel Doorman (uncredited)
 Three Silent Men (1940) - Badger Wood
 Neutral Port (1940) - Charlie Baxter
 Spellbound (1941) - Mr. Nugent
 East of Piccadilly (1941) - George
 I Thank You (1941) - Lomas
 South American George (1941) - (uncredited)
 Hard Steel (1942) - Flavell
 King Arthur Was a Gentleman (1942) - (uncredited)
 San Demetrio London (1943) - Mr. Nelson (uncredited)
 Mr. Emmanuel (1944) - Koch
 Loyal Heart (1946) - Edwards
 Beware of Pity (1946) - Mess Sergeant (uncredited)
 I'll Turn to You (1946) - The Neighbour (uncredited)
 I See a Dark Stranger (1946) - Tynwald Court Usher 
 My Brother Jonathan (1948) - Joseph the Porter
 It's Hard to Be Good (1948) - Taxi Driver (uncredited)
 The History of Mr. Polly (1949) - Mr. Podger (uncredited) 
 For Them That Trespass (1949) - Court Official (uncredited)
 Man on the Run (1949) - Reg Hawkins
 The Blue Lamp (1950) - Drunk (uncredited)
 Madeleine (1950) - Dr. Yeoman
 Once a Sinner (1950) - Mr. Baker
 Let's Have a Murder (1950)
 The Happy Family (1952) - Mayor
 Cosh Boy (1953) - Mr. Beverley
 Impulse (1954) - Joe
 The Passing Stranger (1954) - Maxie
 Footsteps in the Fog (1955) - Corcoran
 Port of Escape (1956) - Bates
 Around the World in Eighty Days (1956) - Featured Player (uncredited)
 Another Time, Another Place (1958) - Alfy
 Stormy Crossing (1958) - Grantly Memorial Doctor
 Blood of the Vampire (1958) - Drunken Doctor
 Jack the Ripper (1959) - Hospital Porter Hodges / Dr. Tranter's Door Keeper
 Sink the Bismarck! (1960) - Civilian Worker on Prince of Wales (uncredited)
 Saturday Night and Sunday Morning (1960) - Mr. Bull
 Reach for Glory (1962) - Headmaster
 Rotten to the Core (1965) - The Admiral (final film role)

References

External links

1897 births
1983 deaths
English male film actors
Male actors from Kingston upon Hull
20th-century English male actors